Yves Cuau (born 10 September 1934, Boulogne-Billancourt) is a French journalist and writer.

Graduated in law and a student at the Institut d'études politiques de Paris, he made his debut in 1960 at the foreign service of Le Figaro.

Works 
1968:  ;
1971: .

Prizes and distinctions 
1968: Albert Londres Prize for Israël attaque.

References

External links 
 Yves Cuau on Babelio
 Yves Cuau publications on CAIRN
 Yves Cuau on Le Monde (9 October 1981)
 Yves Cuau on L'Express

1934 births
People from Boulogne-Billancourt
Sciences Po alumni
20th-century French journalists
21st-century French journalists
20th-century French writers
21st-century French writers
Albert Londres Prize recipients
Living people
Le Figaro people